Bandhan Tod is a mobile app to stop child marriage in India's Bihar state through SOS button in the app. When the SOS on Bandhan Tod is activated, the nearest small NGO will attempt to resolve the issue. If the family resists, then the police gets notified. Till now so many child marriages has been cancelled through Bandhan Tod interventions.

Bandhan Tod is an initiative of Gender Alliance managed by Prashanti Tiwari to support the state government's efforts to end child marriage and dowry.

References 

Mobile applications